Jack Cashman is an Irish-American author. He has published two books, An Irish Immigrant Story and Three Steps to the Making of an Assassin. The former chronicles the struggles of an Irish immigrant family and Ireland's drive for independence, while the latter analyzes the Vietnam War's impact on two friends from a New England mill town.

Prior to becoming a novelist, Cashman served as commissioner of Maine's Department of Economic and Community Development and chairman of the Maine Public Utilities Commission.

Personal life 
Cashman lives in Hampden, Maine with his wife, Betty.

References

External links 
 Jack Cashman

Writers from Maine
American people of Irish descent
People from Hampden, Maine
Living people
Year of birth missing (living people)